Mykola Viktorovych Babenko (born 17 September 1980) is a Ukrainian politician currently serving as a People's Deputy of Ukraine representing Ukraine's 90th electoral district from Dovira since 2019. He was elected as a member of Bila Tserkva Together.

Early life and career 
Mykola Viktorovych Babenko was born on 17 September 1980 in the southern Ukrainian city of Kryvyi Rih. He is an orphan. In 2002, he graduated from the international relations institute of Taras Shevchenko National University of Kyiv, specialising in private international law. In 2005, he completed his postgraduate studies at Shevchenko University's faculty of law.

In 2001, Babenko began working as a legal assistant. In 2003, he began practicing law on his own. He also worked in the road construction industry. In 2015, he founded BioPromEnerho TOV, which he served as director of prior to becoming a People's Deputy. He was also head of BC Invest, an investment attraction group.

Political career 
Babenko became a deputy from the Ukrainian Democratic Alliance for Reform in the Kyiv Oblast Council in the 2010 Ukrainian local elections. He mounted his first campaign to become a People's Deputy of Ukraine in the 2012 Ukrainian parliamentary election, running in Ukraine's 211th electoral district. He lost the election, placing third behind Party of Regions candidate  and the winner, Serhiy Teryokhin of Batkivshchyna. He gathered 26.20% of the vote, 4.2% behind Teryokhin's 30.40% and only 320 votes behind Lysov.

During the 2014 Ukrainian parliamentary election Babenko launched another campaign, this time in Ukraine's 90th electoral district as the candidate of the Petro Poroshenko Bloc. He was defeated by Oleksandr Marchenko of Svoboda, with 20.60% of the vote to Marchenko's 23.66%.

In the 2019 Ukrainian parliamentary election, Babenko ran once again to become a People's Deputy in the 90th electoral district, this time as the candidate of Bila Tserkva Together. This time, Babenko was successfully elected, winning against Servant of the People candidate Yuriy Nesterchuk with 28.23% to Nesterchuk's 16.00%.

In the Verkhovna Rada (Ukraine's parliament), Babenko joined the Dovira parliamentary group. He is secretary of the Verkhovna Rada Committee on Social Policies and Protection of Veterans' Rights. He is also a member of the "A Country Accessible to Everyone" inter-factional association.

References 

1980 births
Living people
Ninth convocation members of the Verkhovna Rada
Petro Poroshenko Bloc politicians
Politicians from Kryvyi Rih
Ukrainian Democratic Alliance for Reform politicians